Katharina Steinruck (née Heinig; born 22 August 1989) is a German long distance runner. She competed in the women's marathon at the 2017 World Championships in Athletics.

References

External links
 

1989 births
Living people
German female long-distance runners
German female marathon runners
World Athletics Championships athletes for Germany
Place of birth missing (living people)
Athletes (track and field) at the 2020 Summer Olympics
Olympic athletes of Germany
20th-century German women
21st-century German women